Stella Campbell (born 15 June 2002) is an Australian cricketer who plays as a right-arm medium bowler and right-handed batter for the New South Wales Breakers in the Women's National Cricket League (WNCL) and the Sydney Sixers in the Women's Big Bash League (WBBL). Campbell made her debut in the 2019–20 Women's Big Bash League season, playing in thirteen matches. In September 2020, she re-signed for the Sydney Sixers for the 2020 tournament.

In August 2021, Campbell was named in Australia's squad for their series against India, which included a one-off day/night Test match as part of the tour. Campbell made her Women's One Day International (WODI) debut on 26 September 2021, for Australia against India. Campbell made her Test debut on 30 September 2021, also for Australia against India.

In January 2022, Campbell was named in Australia's A squad for their series against England A, with the matches being played alongside the Women's Ashes. Later the same month, Campbell was added to Australia's main squad ahead of the one-off Ashes Test match, following an injury to Tayla Vlaeminck.

References

External links

Stella Campbell at Cricket Australia

2002 births
Living people
Australian women cricketers
Australia women Test cricketers
Australia women One Day International cricketers
Place of birth missing (living people)
New South Wales Breakers cricketers
Sydney Sixers (WBBL) cricketers